Andrea Elizabeth Eugenio Torres (born May 4, 1990) is a Filipino actress, singer, host, dancer and commercial model. She is currently an exclusive contract artist of GMA Network. She is best known for her roles as Cindy Rodriguez in the WeTV Original series BetCin, Diane San Luis in Legal Wives, Venus Torralba-de Jesus in Alyas Robin Hood, Cecilia Fulgencio-Altamonte in Sana Ay Ikaw Na Nga, Juliet and Jasmine in The Better Woman, Annasandra in Ang Lihim ni Annasandra and Luisa in The Millionaire's Wife, among others.

Acting career 
Torres was first seen as one of the contestants in ABS-CBN's teen-oriented reality show Qpids in 2005. In 2008, she transferred to ABS-CBN's rival network GMA and became one of the hosts of the now-defunct youth-oriented magazine show, Ka-Blog! She was also part of some drama and hit movies such as You To Me Are Everything, a Dingdong Dantes and Marian Rivera starrer, and Shake, Rattle & Roll X.

When Ka-Blog! went off the air, Torres concentrated for a while in her studies, taking up communication arts at the University of Santo Tomas. On March 8, 2011, Torres signed a three-year exclusive contract with GMA Network. Two months later, she landed a part in the afternoon drama series Blusang Itim.

It helped that she had joined extracurricular activities while in school. She performed during assemblies, acted in plays, attended leadership conventions, even volunteered to read Bible verses during Masses. She was also in the volleyball team. When she was younger she took up ballet lessons. She tried everything that could help her express herself as an artist.

In 2012, Torres, together with Mikael Daez, reprised the roles of Cecilia Fulgencio and Carlos Miguel Altamonte, respectively, for Sana Ay Ikaw Na Nga, a 2012 remake based on the 2001 popular teledrama of the same name. The said roles were originally portrayed by Tanya Garcia and Dingdong Dantes, respectively.

In 2013, Torres starred in the romantic comedy With a Smile as Isay, a rural lady who has a passion for cooking. In 2014, she starred in the fantasy-romance drama Ang Lihim ni Annasandra as the title character who is cursed to transform into an aswang every night. She also starred in the 2016 television series The Millionaire's Wife as Louisa, a single mother who decides to marry a rich, old man in exchange for financial help for her son suffering from juvenile diabetes. In the action-drama television series Alyas Robin Hood, Torres played Venus, alongside Dingdong Dantes and Megan Young.

Torres appeared on the cover of FHM Philippines' December 2014 issue. She was also voted No. 2 in FHM Philippines' 100 Sexiest Women in the World 2015 poll, and No. 15 in the 2016 poll. In 2015, she published her coffee table photo-book titled Andrea: Roadtrip.

She was a mainstay of Bubble Gang between 2012 and 2019. She starred in a Cambodian and Argentinian films.

In 2022, viewers applauded Torres for her portrayal of Sisa in historical fantasy series Maria Clara at Ibarra.

Filmography

Television

Film

References

External links 

Sparkle GMA Artist Center profile

1990 births
Living people
Tagalog people
University of Santo Tomas alumni
Actresses from Manila
Participants in Philippine reality television series
Filipino television personalities
Filipino television actresses
Filipino film actresses
ABS-CBN personalities
Star Magic
GMA Network personalities
Filipino women television presenters
Filipino television variety show hosts
Filipina gravure idols
Filipino female models